Andreas Löw (also spelled Loew; born 19 January 1982) is a German shooter. He represented his country at the 2016 Summer Olympics in men's double trap. In the qualification round, he set a new Olympic record. During the semifinals, he finished in 6th place and did not advance to the finals.

References

External links 
 
 
 
 

1982 births
Living people
German male sport shooters
Shooters at the 2016 Summer Olympics
Olympic shooters of Germany
European Games competitors for Germany
Shooters at the 2019 European Games
Shooters at the 2020 Summer Olympics
21st-century German people